Ek Hasina Do Diwane is a 1972 Hindi-language romance film, produced by Kantibhai Zaveri under the R. G. Films banner and directed by S. M. Abbas. It stars Jeetendra, Babita, Vinod Khanna in pivotal roles, and the music was composed by Kalyanji-Anandji.

Plot
Amar an orthodox & Prakash flirtatious are best friends. Prakash loves a foreign-returned rose Neeta. Since he is diffident to express his love, he seeks Amar‘s help when Neeta tunes towards Amar and he too loves her. Despite the refusal of her father, Neeta espouses Amar. Soon after, disputes arise, as they belong to various lifestyles. Exploiting it, begrudged Prakash arouses the situation. Once, on the occasion of Neeta's birthday, Prakash throws carousing. Spotting it, furious Amar smacks Neeta when she leaves her autocratic father and sends a divorce notice. Immediately, Amar moves to get her back when he is mortified, yet, he opposes the divorce. Afterward, Amar learns about the arrival of his mother who spends her life on pilgrimage. Thus, he goes with a mutual agreement with Neeta to give divorce provided to be with him as newlyweds until his mother’s return which she accepts. During that period, Neeta understands the sanctity of marriage and the righteousness of Amar and her vanity subsides. Moreover, her father also bows his head down to the kindness of Amar‘s mother. At last, Neeta refuses to divorce and asks forgiveness when Prakash also reforms and pleads pardon. Finally, the movie ends on a happy note with the reunion of the couple.

Cast

Jeetendra as Amar 
Babita as Neeta
Vinod Khanna as Prakash
Om Prakash as Neeta's Father
Nirupa Roy as Amar's Mother
Johnny Walker as Brahmachari
Manmohan Krishna as Barrister

Soundtrack

External links
 

1972 films
1970s Hindi-language films
1970s romance films
Films scored by Kalyanji Anandji
Indian romance films
Hindi-language romance films